This is a list of Maldivian films scheduled to be released in 2023.

Releases

Feature film

Television

See also
 List of Maldivian films of 2022
 Lists of Maldivian films

References 

Maldivian
2023